Ernesto Félix Martínez (born 21 June 1956) is an Argentine politician, who was a National Senator for Córdoba Province from 2015 to 2021 and a National Deputy from 2009 to 2013. He belongs to the Civic Front of Córdoba, a provincial party allied with the Juntos por el Cambio coalition.

Early and personal life
Martínez was born on 21 June 1956 in Buenos Aires. He studied law at the National University of Córdoba, graduating in 1979. He is married to Elizabeth Daga and has two children.

Political career
In 1987, Martínez worked as an advisor to the constituent assembly formed to rewrite the constitution of Córdoba Province. He would play a similar role for the constituent assembly of the City of Córdoba from 1994 to 1995. Later, he worked as a legal advisor for the Córdoba city government from 2003 to 2007, during the mayorship of Luis Juez. From 2007 to 2009, he was a member of the city's Court of Accounts.

In the 2009 legislative election, he was elected to the National Chamber of Deputies on the Civic Front list, which grouped the Civic Front of Córdoba, the Civic Coalition ARI, and the Socialist Party, among other small local parties. He was the third candidate in the list, which received 28.06% of the vote and was the second-most voted alliance in Córdoba Province. Martínez served as president of the five-member Civic Front of Córdoba parliamentary bloc in the Chamber during his 2009–2013 term.

National Senator
In the 2015 general election, Martínez was the first candidate in the Cambiemos list to the National Senate, followed by Laura Rodríguez Machado. With 50.23% of the vote, Cambiemos was the most-voted alliance in the province, granting Martínez and Rodríguez Machado the two seats for the majority as per the limited voting system used for the Argentine upper house. He was sworn in on 3 December 2015. In the Senate, he sat as part of the PRO Front bloc.

As senator, Caserio formed part of the parliamentary commissions on Constitutional Affairs, General Legislation, Accords, National Defense, and Justice and Criminal Affairs, the latter three of which he served as vice president of. He was a supporter of the legalisation of abortion in Argentina, voting in favour the two Voluntary Interruption of Pregnancy bill debated by the Argentine Congress in 2018 and 2020.

Martínez did not stand for re-election in 2021, and his term expired on 10 December 2021.

References

External links
 

1956 births
Living people
Politicians from Buenos Aires
People from Córdoba Province, Argentina
Members of the Argentine Senate for Córdoba
Members of the Argentine Chamber of Deputies elected in Córdoba
National University of Córdoba alumni
20th-century Argentine politicians
21st-century Argentine politicians